The Fairey Seal was a British carrier-borne spotter-reconnaissance aircraft, operated in the 1930s. The Seal was derived – like the Gordon – from the IIIF. To enable the Fairey Seal to be launched by catapult from warships, it could be fitted with floats.

Service life and operations
The Seal was designed and built by Fairey Aviation. It first flew in 1930 and entered squadron service with the Fleet Air Arm (FAA) in 1933. Ninety-one aircraft were produced.

The FAA started to replace it with the Swordfish Mk1 from 1936. By 1938 all FAA torpedo squadrons had been entirely re-equipped with the Swordfish. The Seal was removed from front-line service by 1938, but remained in secondary and support roles. By the outbreak of the Second World War, only four remained in service. The type was retired fully by 1943. The type was last used in India as an instructional airframe from the Royal Navy Photographic Unit.

The RAF also operated the Seal as a target tug. Twelve aircraft were part of the RAF's No 10 Bombing and Gunnery School until 1940. A further four aircraft were used by 273 Squadron in Ceylon. These aircraft were used on coastal patrols, some as floatplanes. By May 1942, the type had been retired from RAF service.

In 1934 Latvia ordered four Seal floatplanes for its naval aviation (factory numbers F.2112 – 2115, tactical numbers 26 – 29, later 98 – 101). Between 22 June and 5 July 1936 three floatplanes under Colonel Janis Indans undertook a 6000 km long journey from Liepāja through Baltic and North European countries to England and back. In autumn 1940, after Latvia's annexation, the aircraft were taken by the Soviets, but they were not used by them, and they remained stored on Kisezers lake. On 28 June 1941 they were destroyed there by German planes.

Variants
 Fairey IIIF Mk VI : The first prototype was converted from a Fairey IIIF MK IIIB. 
 Fairey Seal : Three-seat spotter-reconnaissance aircraft for the Royal Navy.

Operators
 
Argentine Navy
 
 Chilean Navy
 Chilean Air Force
 
 Latvian Navy
 Latvian Air Force (from 1936)
 
 Peruvian Air Force
 Peruvian Navy
 
 Royal Air Force
 Fleet Air Arm
701 Naval Air Squadron
702 Naval Air Squadron
753 Naval Air Squadron
820 Naval Air Squadron
821 Naval Air Squadron
822 Naval Air Squadron
823 Naval Air Squadron
824 Naval Air Squadron

Specifications (Landplane)

See also

References

Bibliography

External links

Fleet Air Arm Archive
Fairey Seal – British Aircraft of World War II
Latvian Aviation 

1930s British military reconnaissance aircraft
Seal
Biplanes
Single-engined tractor aircraft
Carrier-based aircraft
Aircraft first flown in 1930